The 2002 FESPIC Games, officially known as the 8th FESPIC Games, was an Asia-Pacific disabled multi-sport event held in Busan, South Korea from 26 October to 1 November 2002, 12 days after the 2002 Asian Games. It was one of the two FESPIC Games to have held at the same host city as the Asian Games, the other being the 1999 FESPIC Games in Bangkok, Thailand.

It was the first time South Korea hosted the games as it is the seventh FESPIC organisation member to host the FESPIC games after Japan, Australia, Hong Kong, Indonesia, China, Thailand. Around 2,199 athletes from 40 nations competed at the games which featured 17 sports. The games was opened by the Prime Minister of South Korea, Kim Suk-soo at the Busan Asiad Stadium.

Development and preparation
The Busan Fespic Games Organising Committee (BUFOC) was formed to oversee the staging of the games.

Venues
The 8th FESPIC Games had 16 venues for the games, 14 in Busan and 2 in South Gyeongsang.

Symbols

The logo of the 2002 FESPIC Games is a traditional Korean design image which resembles both a wave, the symbol of the host city, Busan, an adynamic 'Tae-geuk' mark, and a sportsman racing with a torch. It symbolizes the integration of the Asia-Pacific region through the interaction in sports and the determination of the disabled people to overcome the barriers. The sporty emblem in typical Korean colours and smooth brush strokes represents the desire for a society where those with disabilities and those without live together in harmony.

The mascot of the 2002 FESPIC Games is a turtle named "Gwidong-Ih" which literally means a cute child in Korean. The mascot's name also refers to a turtle which is pronounced "gwi" (龜) when written in Chinese characters. The use of turtle as the games' mascot is to symbolize the tireless effort of disabled people towards rehabilitation and social participation. Also, the "V" sign showed by the mascot, the initial for "victory", represents the Games as a celebration of victory of Humanity.

The games

Sports

  Archery
  Athletics
  Powerlifting
  Badminton
  Bowling
  Boccia
  Cycling
  Fencing
  Football 7-a-side
  Judo
  Lawn bowls
  Shooting
  Swimming
  Sitting volleyball
  Table tennis
  Wheelchair basketball
  Wheelchair tennis

Medal table

See also
 2002 Asian Games

References

External links
 2002 FESPIC Games Official website

Asian Para Games
FESPIC Games
FESPIC Games
FESPIC
Multi-sport events in South Korea
International sports competitions hosted by South Korea
Sport in Busan
October 2002 sports events in Asia
November 2002 sports events in Asia
FESPIC Games